Ann-Mari Hvaal  (born 8 June 1944) is a Norwegian artistic gymnast. She was born in Sandefjord. She competed at the 1968 Summer Olympics.

References

External links 
 

1944 births
Living people
People from Sandefjord
Norwegian female artistic gymnasts
Olympic gymnasts of Norway
Gymnasts at the 1968 Summer Olympics
Sportspeople from Vestfold og Telemark
20th-century Norwegian women